Hubert Henry Lappin (16 January 1879 – 1925) was an English professional footballer who played as an outside left in the Football League for Clapton Orient, Manchester United, Grimsby Town and Birmingham.

Personal life 
Lappin had two brothers, was married to Elizabeth and had two sons. As of 1900, he worked as a yarn dyer. He served in the 1st Royal Lancashire Militia of the King's Own (Royal Lancaster Regiment) for a short period in 1900 and remained on the reserve list until 1910. In April 1915, 9 months after the breakout of the First World War, Lappin enlisted as a sergeant in the Royal Flying Corps. He became a Sergeant Mechanic in March 1918 and was discharged in April 1920.

Career statistics

Honours 
Chester
 The Combination:1908–09
 Cheshire Senior Cup: 1908–09
Hurst
 Manchester League: 1911–12
 Manchester Junior Cup: 1910–11
Macclesfield
 Lancashire Combination Second Division second-place promotion: 1913–14

References

External links 
Profile at MUFCInfo.com

1879 births
English footballers
Oldham Athletic A.F.C. players
Manchester United F.C. players
Grimsby Town F.C. players
Footballers from Manchester
Brentford F.C. wartime guest players
Rossendale United F.C. players
Nelson F.C. players
Rhyl F.C. players
Leyton Orient F.C. players
Chester City F.C. players
Birmingham City F.C. players
Chirk AAA F.C. players
Oswestry United F.C. players
Wrexham A.F.C. players
Macclesfield Town F.C. players
English Football League players
Ashton United F.C. players
1925 deaths
British Army personnel of World War I
King's Own Royal Regiment soldiers
Royal Flying Corps soldiers
Royal Air Force personnel of World War I
Royal Air Force airmen
Association football outside forwards
Military personnel from Manchester